Toyota Verblitz is a Japanese rugby union team in the Japan Rugby League One. Verblitz is a portmanteau of verde (Spanish and Portuguese for 'green') and blitz (German for 'lightning'). The team is owned by Toyota Motor Corporation and is not to be confused with the Toyota Industries Shuttles rugby team, owned by Toyota Industries. It shares Toyota Stadium in the city of Toyota, Aichi with the football club Nagoya Grampus which also used to be owned by Toyota Motors.

Slogan for 2006 season: 克己　Kokki (Self-Control)

Honours
All-Japan Championship
 Champions: 1969, 1968, 1987
 Runners-up: 2007

Results
Verblitz (surprisingly given the team's pedigree) failed to make the cut for the first season of the Top League (2003-4) but entered the Top League in the second season and were a contender for the second Microsoft Cup. They lost the Japan Championship final on February 27, 2005, to NEC Green Rockets 13–17.

Current squad

The Toyota Verblitz squad for the 2023 season is:

 * denotes players qualified to play for the Japan on dual nationality or residency grounds.

Former players
Troy Flavell - lock (now in France with Bayonne)
Tamaiti Horua - No. 8 (formerly Brumbies), now Western Force in 2008 season
Orene Aii
Filo Tiatia - No. 8 (now in Wales with the Ospreys}
Dominic Day 2016 - Lock (Now playing for  Saracens in the (English Premiership)
Takashi Kikutani (2004–13, 114 games) Loose forward, Japanese International (2005–14, 68 caps)
Toshizumi Kitagawa (2004-19, 102 games) Lock, Japanese International (2005–13, 43 caps)
Wycliff Palu (2016-17, 14 games) Loose forward, Wallaby (2006–16, 58 caps)
Lionel Cronjé (2017–22, 48 games) Fly-half
Kieran Read (2020-21, 10 games) Loose forward, Allblack (2008–19, 128 caps)
Michael Hooper (2021, 10 games) Loose forward, Wallaby (2012–, 121 caps)

References

External links
 Toyota Verblitz - official site

Japan Rugby League One teams
Rugby clubs established in 1941
Tourist attractions in Aichi Prefecture
Toyota
1941 establishments in Japan